Hardsoul is a duo of house music producers and DJs from the Netherlands, made up of the brothers Rogier (DJ Roog) and Greg van Bueren.

Biography
Founded in 1997, Hardsoul began releasing music on Soulfuric Recordings, a label owned by Marc Pomeroy and Brian Tappert. This led to another release on Soulfuric, "Sweatshop", in 2003, before graduating to Defected Records' sublabel ITH Records, where they released "Backtogether", a vocal anthem sung by Ron Carroll, in 2003. It received airplay on mainstream radio, and peaked at #60 in the UK Singles Chart.

Discography
1998 "Do What I Gotta Do"
1999 "Fight The Feeling/Your Last Dance"
2000 "Late Night Sessions Vol. 1"
2001 "Where Did Our Love Go", with Forrest Thomas
2001 "La Pasion De Gozar"
2001 "All Night Long", with Rose Stigter
2002 "Caracho"
2002 "Never Gonna Stop", with The Soul Hustlers
2003 "Sweatshop", with New Cool Collective
2003 "6 Dah/Former Destiny"
2003 "Tricky Bizniz #1"
2003 "Back Together", with Ron Carroll
2004 "Committed"
2004 "Plastiko EP"
2004 "The Hardsoul EP"
2004 "Lapoema", with Olav Basoski
2005 "Bounsoun", with New Cool Collective
2005 "Über", as Hardsoul presents Roog & Greg
2006 "No Man", with Shaun Escoffery
2006 "Don't Let Love Weigh You Down", with Amma
2006 "Deep Inside"
2006 "My Life", with Ron Carroll and Sven Vigee
2007 "Your Mind Is Twisted", with Jeroenski
2009 "Shed My Skin" with Erick E as HouseQuake, featuring Anita Kelsey

References

Remixers
Club DJs
Dutch DJs
Dutch house music groups
Dutch musical duos
Electronic music duos